Bromo Tengger Semeru National Park (abbreviated as ) is a national park located in East Java, Indonesia, to the east of Malang and Lumajang, to the south of Pasuruan and Probolinggo, and to the southeast of Surabaya, the capital of East Java. It is the only conservation area in Indonesia that has a sand sea, the Tengger Sand Sea, across which is the caldera of an ancient volcano (Tengger) from which four new volcanic cones have emerged. The massif also contains the highest mountain in Java, Mount Semeru, four lakes and 50 rivers. It is named after the Tengger tribe. The explosion of the volcano that created the caldera, happened ca. 45.000 years ago, in an event similar to the Krakatau eruption. 

The Tengger Sand Sea has been protected since 1919. The Bromo Tengger Semeru National Park was declared a national park in 1982.

Geography

Tengger massif

The Tengger massif is a massif within the park. The area is an active volcanic complex surrounded by a plain of sand.

Volcanism
The volcanic complex of Tengger forms a condition where a new caldera of volcano forms inside a larger and more ancient caldera. There are five volcanoes inside the Tengger Caldera: Mount Bromo (2,329 m), Mount Batok (2,470 m), Mount Kursi (2,581 m), Mount Watangan (2,661 m), and Mount Widodaren (2,650 m). Mount Batok is the only peak that is no longer active, and is covered in casuarina trees. Mount Widodaren, located beside Mount Batok, contains the cave Widodaren, which is considered sacred by local people.

Other mountains around the Tengger caldera are: Mount Pananjakan (2,770 m), Mount Cemorolawang (2,227 m), Mount Lingker (2,278 m), Mount Pundak Lembu (2,635 m), Mount Jantur (2,705 m), Mount Ider-ider (2,527 m) and Mount Mungal (2,480 m). The peak of Mount Pananjakan is the most popular place to watch the entire volcanic complex of Tengger.

Further south in the national park, there is another volcanic complex called the Semeru Group or Jambangan Group. This area contains the highest peak of Java, Mount Semeru (3,676 m). Other mountains within this area are Mount Lanang (2,313 m), Mount Ayek-ayek (2,819 m), Mount Pangonan Cilik (2,833 m), Mount Keduwung (2,334 m), Mount Jambangan (3,020 m), Mount Gentong (1,951 m), Mount Kepolo (3,035 m), and Mount Malang (2,401 m). The Semeru forest area has many rivers that are former lava lines from Mount Semeru. The Semeru group is considered to be very productive, producing volcanic matters such as lava, volcanic ash, and hot cloud and spreading it to the surrounding area. The lower area is surrounded with fertile rice fields.

Climate
The climate in Bromo Tengger Semeru is cold, especially in winter from May until September. There is heavy rainfall in summer, while there is little to no precipitation in winter. Nighttime temperatures in winter commonly fall below zero degrees Celsius, with potential for frost and light snow. It is classified as a subtropical highland.

Ecosystem

According to height and temperature differences, the forests within the area can be classified into three zones:

Sub-montane zone (750 – 1,500 m)
This zone is classified as a tropical rainforest. It can be found in the southern area of Semeru, East Semeru (Burno), and West Semeru (Patok Picis).
This zone is dominated with plants of the families Fagaceae, Moraceae, Anacardiaceae, Sterculiaceae, and Rubiaceae. There are also liana trees, such as a variety from the genus Calamus, Piper, Asplenium, and Begonia, and other plants from the family Araceae, Poaceae, and Zingiberaceae. There are also 225 species of orchid in this area.

Montane zone (1,500 – 2,440 m)

Plant life is greatly reduced in this area. Most of the species that grow in this area are pioneer species. There are also some wooden plants such as cemara (Casuarina junghuhniana),  (Vaccinium varingifolium), kemlandingan gunung (Albizia lophantha), acacia bark (Acacia decurrens) and bottom plants such as Javanese edelweiss or senduro (Anaphalis longifongila and Anaphalis javanica), Imperata cylindrica, Pteris sp., Themeda sp. and Centella asiatica.

The Tengger Sand Sea in Tengger Caldera is a special ecosystem. The area is covered in volcanic sedimentation of sand from Mount Bromo activities. The resulting area is believed to be the only known desert-like area in Indonesia. The Tengger Sand Sea has been protected since 1919.

Subalpine zone (above 2,400 m)
Kemlandingan gunung (Albizia lophantha) and Javanese edelweiss can also be found growing in this zone.

On Mount Semeru, there is no plant life above the altitude of 3,100 m. This zone is covered in loose sandstones.

Flora and fauna
Some endangered flora are protected in this park, such as Fagaceae, Moraceae, Sterculiaceae, Casuarina junghuhniana, Javanese edelweiss, and about 200 species of endemic orchids. There is a relatively small diversity of fauna in the Bromo Tengger Semeru National Park. There are about 137 species of birds, 22 species of mammals and 4 species of reptiles protected in the national park. Examples are besra, green peafowl, Javan rusa, Sumatran dhole, crab-eating macaque, marbled cat and Javan leopard.

Culture

The area in and around the park is inhabited by the Tengger people, one of the few significant Hindu communities remaining on the island of Java. Their population of roughly 600,000 is centered in thirty villages in the isolated Tengger mountains including Mount Bromo and areas within the park. The local religion is a remnant from the Majapahit era and therefore quite similar to that on Bali but with even more animist elements. The Tengger people are believed to be descendants of the Majapahit empire and were driven into the hills after mass arrival in the area of Muslim Madurese in the 19th century.

Gallery

See also
 List of national parks of Indonesia
 Geography of Indonesia
Yadnya Kasada

References

External links

Bromo Tengger Semeru National Park

National parks of Indonesia
Geography of East Java
Tourist attractions in East Java
Biosphere reserves of Indonesia